Garry George McDonald AO (born 30 October 1948) is an Australian actor, satirist and comedian. In a career spanning five decades he has had many theatre, television and film roles, and has been listed as a National Living Treasure. He is best known as the seemingly naive celebrity interviewer Norman Gunston, through whom he pioneered the "ambush interviewer" technique since followed by many others. He received a Gold Logie award for the television Norman Gunston Show in which he developed the character. He is also famed for his role of the hapless Arthur Beare in the television sitcom Mother and Son. Appointed an Officer of the Order of Australia in 2003 for service to the community in the mental health field and to the arts as an entertainer, he has also been a board member of the Australian mental health organisation Beyond Blue.

Career
McDonald was born in Bondi, a beachside suburb of Sydney. He was educated at Cranbrook School. During his time at Cranbrook, McDonald developed an interest in acting and, despite family objections, went on to study at the National Institute of Dramatic Art (NIDA), where he obtained a Diploma in Acting (misspelled "Actinig") in 1967.

Norman Gunston

It was while working on The Aunty Jack Show in 1973, that McDonald first performed the character for which he became best-known, the gauche and inept TV personality Norman Gunston. Gunston's first appearance was in a series of brief sketches written by Wendy Skelcher which saw him reporting uncomfortably on a "sex-scandal drought" in the New South Wales city of Wollongong; a drought he eventually breaks by appearing naked on camera.

In 1975, McDonald further developed the Gunston character on television in the Norman Gunston Show, for which he won a Gold Logie. His writing team included Morris Gleitzman (now a successful children's author) and veteran TV comedy writer Bill Harding, who had written for the Australian TV satire The Mavis Bramston Show.

Gunston's trademark outfit consisted of an iridescent-blue tuxedo jacket, black stovepipe trousers, and sneakers with white socks. Gunston had a comb over type hairstyle and used makeup to make his face deathbed white and had bits of tissue drying on shaving nicks.

The series, which satirised many aspects of Australian culture and show business, was a mixture of live and pre-recorded interviews, awkward musical segments – excruciatingly sung by Gunston himself in the broadest "strine" accent – and continuing comedy sketches such as "Norman's Dreamtime" (in which Norman read stories to a group of children, such as "Why Underpants Ride Up").

Using Gunston's gormless personality as a cover to break down the defences of his "victims", McDonald pioneered the satirically provocative "ambush interview" technique which was used to great effect in interviews with Paul McCartney, Muhammad Ali, Keith Moon, Leif Garrett and actress Sally Struthers. When Gunston interviewed Elton John, who was in Australia to promote Tommy, Gunston began by asking "Are you going to premiere in Wollongong?" "No, but I've played tennis with her", John responded. "You're thinking of Evonne Wollongong", Gunston said, "I'm talking about the city."

As Norman Gunston, McDonald also had a successful recording career, releasing a string of satirical novelty pop records that anticipated the pop parodies of "Weird Al" Yankovic. Norman's Top 40 chart hits included his interpretation of the Tom Jones classic "Delilah", the punk rock send-up "I Might Be A Punk But I Love You, Baby" and "KISS Army", a parody of the KISS single "I Was Made For Loving You".

Mother and Son
McDonald played Arthur Beare in the television series Mother and Son, starring alongside Ruth Cracknell over six seasons from 1984 until 1994. He won several Logie Awards for his role in the show (see below).

Offspring
McDonald joined the cast of the Network Ten drama series Offspring in 2012 (series three) and was a series regular. He played Doctor Philip Noonan.

Other work
He has had lead roles and guest roles in several theatrical stage roles and well as television appearances.

Personal
Early in his career he met his wife, the actress Diane Craig, during a production of Let's Get A Divorce. They married in 1971  They have two grown children and live in Berry on the New South Wales south coast.

Suffering from both depression and anxiety, McDonald talks openly about his condition. He is an ambassador and former board director of Beyond Blue, an Australian national depression initiative. He also serves as patron of the New South Wales branch of the Anxiety Disorders Foundation of Australia. McDonald is quoted in the press discussing a link between his own anxiety and that of his grandfather and mother.

McDonald's condition first came to the public's attention when he reached a crisis point after a short-lived attempt to revive the Gunston character in 1993. Then again in 1997, McDonald suffered a severe episode during the launch of a new series, Rip Snorters. McDonald's condition also caused him to withdraw from the 2003 production of Patrick Marber's Howard Katz.

Filmography

Feature films
 The Light Between Oceans (2016)
 Old Denton Road (2014)
 Don't Be Afraid of the Dark (2010)
 The Rage in Placid Lake (2003)
 Rabbit-Proof Fence (2002)
 Moulin Rouge! (2001)
 Mr. Accident (2000)
 Struck By Lightning (1990)
 Ghosts Can Do It (1987)
 The Bee Eater (1986)
 Wills & Burke (1985) as Robert O'Hara Burke
 Jolly (1982)
 Ginger Meggs (1982) as John Meggs
 The Pirate Movie (1982) as Sergeant/Inspector
 The Picture Show Man (1977) as Lou
 Picnic at Hanging Rock (1975) as Const. Jones
 Stone (1974) as bike mechanic
 Avengers of the Reef (1973) as Updike's aide

Television
 Rake (2012)
 Offspring (2012)
 A Model Daughter: The Killing of Caroline Byrne (2009)
 Talking Heads (2009)
 Two Twisted (2006)
 Stepfather of the Bride (2005)
 Enough Rope with Andrew Denton (2004)
 Mary Bryant (2004)
 Love is a 4 Letter Word (2000)
 All Saints (1999)
 The Adventures of Chuck Finn (1999)
 Halifax f.p. (1998)
 Medivac (1997)
 Rip Snorters (1997)
 Fallen Angels (1996)
 Fire II (1995)
 Mother and Son (1984–1994)
 GP (1994)
 Eggshells (1991–1993)
 Woman in a Lampshade (1993)
 The Other Side Of Paradise (1992)
 Counting from Six (1986)
 Banduk (1985)
 News Free Zone (1985)
 The Top Kid, Winners series (1984)
 Five Mile Creek (1984)
 Prime Time (1984)
 Jimmy Dancer (1981)
 The Garry McDonald Show (1977)
 The Norman Gunston Show (1975–1979)
 Wollongong the Brave (1975)
 Flash Nick from Jindavick (1974)
 The Aunty Jack Show (1973)
 Over There (1973)
 A Brace and a Bit (1973)
 Snake Gully with Dad 'n' Dave (1972)

Theatre
 On 5 April 2008 he began his role of Nathan Detroit in the stage production Guys and Dolls, which was held at the Princess Theatre in Melbourne, before transferring to the Capitol Theatre, Sydney, in 2009.
 In 2010 he has played Dennis Johnson in the touring play Halpern and Johnson alongside Henri Szeps, who played his venal and scheming older brother in Mother and Son.
 In 2011, he appeared in David Mamet's play November, produced by the South Australian State Theatre Company.
 Don's Party (2011)
 The Grenade (2010) 
 The Give and Take (2006)
 Two Brothers (2005)
 Amigos (2004)
 Laughter on the 23rd Floor (2002)
 Stones in His Pockets – director (2001)
 Up For Grabs (2001)
 After the Ball (1998)
 Little Shop of Horrors (1997)
 Emerald City (1997)
 Hotspur (1994)
 Sugar Babies (1987)
 Glengarry Glen Ross
 Floating World
 Uncle Vanya
 Who's Afraid of Virginia Woolf?

Awards and honours
In 2003, McDonald was appointed an officer of the Order of Australia for service to the community by raising awareness of mental health issues and the effects of anxiety disorders and depression on sufferers and carers, and to the arts as an entertainer.

His popularity among Australians is reflected his being listed, after public nomination and vote, as a National Living Treasure, someone who has made an outstanding contribution to Australian society in any field of human endeavour.

In 2015, he was a featured subject on the ABC documentary series Australian Story.

In 2020, he appeared on a stamp in the Australia Post Legends of Comedy series.

Mo Awards
The Australian Entertainment Mo Awards (commonly known informally as the Mo Awards), were annual Australian entertainment industry awards. They recognise achievements in live entertainment in Australia from 1975 to 2016. Garry McDonald won one award in that time.
 (wins only)
|-
| 2004
| Garry McDonald
| Male Actor of the Year
| 
|-

Art portraits 
Two portraits of McDonald have won awards at the Archibald Prize. In 1999 a portrait by artist Deny Christian won the Packing Room Prize and, in 2006, Paul Jackson's All the world's a stage won the Peoples Choice Award. In 2016, yet another painting of McDonald was a finalist in the Archibald Prize by Kirsty Neilson entitled There's No Humour in Darkness.

References

External links
2002 interview for Australian Story

Garry McDonald at the National Film and Sound Archive
Garry McDonald at Screen Australia

1948 births
Australian male comedians
Australian male film actors
Australian male stage actors
Australian male television actors
Living people
Logie Award winners
Male actors from Sydney
National Institute of Dramatic Art alumni
Mental health activists
Officers of the Order of Australia
People educated at Cranbrook School, Sydney
20th-century Australian comedians
20th-century Australian male actors
21st-century Australian comedians
21st-century Australian male actors